Kelleners is a surname. Notable people with the surname include:

Helmut Kelleners (born 1939), German racing driver
Ralf Kelleners (born 1968), German racing driver
Wim Kelleners (born 1950), Dutch cyclist